The Iran and Saudi Arabia national football teams are sporting rivals  who have played each other since 1975.

The game has been ranked 9th in Bleacher Report's "International Football's 10 Most Politically-Charged Football Rivalries" and 8th in Goal.com's "Football's 10 Greatest International Rivalries".

Iran and Saudi Arabia team have had 14 matches so far, all have been competitive, and they have never played a friendly match. The first match was played on 24 August 1975, with Iran defeating Saudi Arabia 3–0.

Origins
The two have long battled for West Asian supremacy and their matches have been "always tight, tense and furiously competitive".

The countries also have had chronic political tensions in the last decades. (see Iran–Saudi Arabia relations)

The rivalry has been expanded into club matches as well. For example, after the Saudi Arabian national team's away win in March 2009, Saudi players sword-danced in front of 100,000 angry Iranian fans in Azadi Stadium. When Zob Ahan eliminated Al-Hilal in the 2010 AFC Champions League semi-final, Iranian players mocked the dance in front of Saudi fans.
When Persepolis was scheduled to play away at Ittihad in the 2011 AFC Champions League, Saudi immigration authorities forced Iranian players to be fingerprinted and irises scanned upon their arrival at Jeddah airport. The Iranians refused to do so and were held at the airport for 8 hours.

Iranian football fans take most pleasure in defeating Saudi Arabia, alongside Bahrain, whose players used to wave Saudi Arabian flags when they defeated Iran 3–1 during their 2002 World Cup qualification. For several Iranian fans, regional political rivalries also affect who they support on the field, according to Aljazeera.

In 2016, clubs from Saudi Arabia refused to play in Iran during the 2016 AFC Champions League.

Matches
Source:

Statistics

Top scorers

See also
Iran–Iraq football rivalry
Iran–Saudi Arabia relations
Iraq–Saudi Arabia football rivalry

References

International association football rivalries
Saudi Arabia national football team
Iran–Saudi Arabia relations
Saudi Arabia
Politics and sports